Kō Bun'yū (born 1938), also known as Huang Wenxiong, is a controversial Taiwanese author, now resident in Japan, who is well known for his staunch anti-Mainland Chinese stance and for penning a number of highly controversial books about Chinese, Japanese and Korean history and culture.

Kō was a visiting professor at Takushoku University. His works often assert that Taiwan and Korea owe their present-day successes, and much of their culture, to Japan.

Books by Kō
The ugly Chinaman (Minikui Chūgoku-jin)
The fabricated history of Japan (捏造された日本史; Netsuzō sareta Nihon-shi)
Japan - falling into the trap of Sinocentrism (中華思想の罠に嵌った日本; Chūka shisō no wana ni hamatta Nihon)
The Japanese people's virtue which has been erased from history - About this country's "Inheritance of the Spirit" which is now being revived (歴史から消された日本人の美徳―今蘇るこの国の"心の遺産"とは; Rekishi kara kesareta Nihon-jin no bitoku - Ima yomigaeru kono kuni no "kokoro no isan" to wa)
The curse of Sinocentrism lurking within Chinese character culture (漢字文明にひそむ中華思想の呪縛; Kanji bunmei ni hisomu Chūka shisō no jubaku)
South Korea was built by the Japanese (韓国は日本人がつくった; Kankoku wa Nihon-jin ga tsukutta)
Taiwan was built by the Japanese people (台湾は日本人がつくった; Taiwan wa Nihon-jin ga tsukutta)
The Bushido spirit bequeathed to Taiwan by the Japanese people (日本人が台湾に遺した武士道精神; Nihon-jin ga Taiwan ni nokoshita Bushidō seishin)
The unknown truth about the Second Sino-Japanese War (日中戦争知られざる真実; Nicchū Sensō no shirarezaru shinjitsu)
The inheritance of Manchukuo (満州国の遺産; Manshūkoku no isan)
How the Chinese are taking advantage of Japanese confusion (つけあがるな中国人うろたえるな日本人; Tsukeagaru na Chūgoku-jin urotaeru na Nihon-jin)
How far will China continue to crack? (どこまで中国に喰われ続けるのか; Doko made Chūgoku ni kuware-tsuzukeru no ka)
7 reasons why China cannot prevail over Japan even if it dies trying (中国が死んでも日本に勝てない7つの理由; Chūgoku ga shinde mo Nihon ni katenai nanatsu no riyū)

Kō also provided the script for the manga An Introduction to China: A Study of Our Bothersome Neighbors (マンガ中国入門 やっかいな隣人の研究; Manga Chūgoku nyūmon: Yakkai na rinjin no kenkyū).

See also
Taiwan independence movement
World United Formosans for Independence
Sinophobia

References

Japanese people of Taiwanese descent
Taiwan independence activists
Waseda University alumni
Meiji University alumni
Writers from Kaohsiung
1938 births
Living people